Simaisma (also spelled Sumaysimah) is a small seaside town located on the eastern coast of Qatar 30 km north of the capital Doha. This town is characterized by old houses and mosques that are relics from the days before oil and natural gas were discovered in Qatar.

It was demarcated in 1988. Small clusters of mangroves dot its coastline. Geographically, it is located in the municipality of Al Daayen, but administratively, it is a part of Al Khor.

History
J.G. Lorimer's Gazetteer of the Persian Gulf gives an account of Simaisma in 1908:

In an earlier 1904 transcript of Lorimer's Gazetteer, he remarks that in 1883, Sheikh Jassim bin Mohammed Al Thani "wished, or pretended he wished, to settle here".

One of the town's landmarks is Simaisma Mosque, constructed in 1938. It is one of the oldest surviving mosques in Qatar. Aside from its minaret and prayer room, it also housed a madrasa, which provided Islamic instruction to young students.

Simaisma was also the location of a battle fought in 1768 between Shaikh Mohamed bin Khalifa Al Khalifa the Chief of Zubarah and the Musalam clan who were bases at Fureiha. The cause of the Battle of Simaisma was Shaikh Mohamed's refusal to pay taxes to the Al Musalam after he built his castle. The Al Musalam were defeated and soon their power waned as a result of this devastation.

Attractions

Beach
Known for its idyllic landscape, Simaisma Beach is a popular domestic tourist attraction. It is closely situated to the Al Simaisma Family Park and extends for a length of roughly 1 km. Dozens shaded lounging areas are offered to visitors. Roughly 39 hectares of mangroves are found just off the coast.

Parks
Simaisma Family Park was established in 1991 over an area 5,099 m². Features of the park include a basketball court, football field and a playground. Landscaping consists of 11 species of seasonal shrubs and flowers, as well as three different species of palm trees.

A recreational facility known as Simaisma Olympic Park was opened in June 2012. Many facilities are found in the park, such as a football pitch, swimming pool, mosque, cafe and youth centre.

Simaisma Resort
Murwab Hotel Group launched Simaisma Resort in February 2016. The resort has 52 villas and 4 restaurants.

Simaisma Youth Centre
Simaisma has a youth centre, founded in November 2007 and formally inaugurated in June 2008. Its Kashta exhibition opened on 18 October 2014. The exhibition showcases materials related to heritage, folk crafts and camping.

Transport

Simaisma is connected to the main highway in the municipality through Simaisma Road, a  carriageway. There is no public transport in the town.

The Simaisma Island Bridge is a 450 meter-long bridge connecting Simaisma's mainland to Simaisma Island.

Education
The town's first formal school for boys was opened in 1957. One year later, a school for girls was opened. Simaisma's public schools only provide primary education. Students typically continue their secondary education in Al Khor.

Sports
Simaisma hosted the first point of the final stage of the Tour of Al Zubarah in December 2015. It also hosted part of the second stage of the 2016 Tour of Qatar.

A small football stadium is located in the town which serves its amateur football team. Simaisma FC won the non-professional Al Frjan League two times in a row in 2013 and 2014.

Archaeology
Plaster vessels designed to resemble Ubaid pottery were found in Simaisma through an archaeological expedition. Also found in the town were two circular burial mounds dating to the 5th century B.C., the earliest burial sites yet discovered in Qatar.

References 

Populated places in Al Khor
Populated coastal places in Qatar